Kaunain Abbas (born 7 May 1990) is an Indian cricketer. He made his first-class debut for Karnataka in the 2016–17 Ranji Trophy on 13 October 2016. He made his List A debut for Karnataka in the 2018–19 Vijay Hazare Trophy on 30 September 2018.

Abbas also played for the Belagavi Panthers and Namma Shivamogga.

References

External links
 

1990 births
Living people
Indian cricketers
Karnataka cricketers
Cricketers from Bangalore